Cotterill is a surname, and may refer to:
Arthur Cotterill (1848–1902), New Zealand cricketer and lawyer, whose four brothers and three sons all played first-class cricket
Colin Cotterill (born 1952), an Anglo-Australian teacher, writer and cartoonist
David Cotterill (born 1987), a Welsh footballer
George Edward Cotterill (1839–1913), an English cricketer who played for Sussex
George Huth Cotterill (1868–1950), an England international footballer, son of George Edward Cotterill
George F. Cotterill (1865–1958), a Seattle, Washington engineer (1890s) and politician (1910s)
Henry Cotterill (1812–1886) Bishop of Edinburgh
James Cotterill (born 1982), a retired English footballer
Joseph Cotterill (1851–1933), an English cricketer who played for Sussex, brother of George Edward Cotterill
Mark Cotterill (born 1960), the founder and former chairman of the England First Party
Murray Cotterill (died 1995), a Canadian trade union activist
Rodney Cotterill (1933–2007), an Anglo–Danish physicist and neuroscientist
Steve Cotterill (born 1964), an English footballer and manager
 Thomas Cotterill (1779-1823), an English hymn-writer